Carlatton and Cumrew are civil parishes in Cumbria, England with a common parish council.

The Eastern boundary of this rural parish is Cardunneth Pike in Cumrew Fell close to Turnberry House. To the West Carlatton Mill sits on the boundary between Cumrew Parish and Cumwhitton Parish. To the North Brackenthwate Farm sits just inside the parish. The southern boundary is the northern edge of Newbiggin Village.

References

External links
 Cumbria County History Trust: Carlatton (nb: provisional research only - see Talk page)

City of Carlisle